Jamaica Inn is a novel by the English writer Daphne du Maurier, first published in 1936. It was later made into a film, also called Jamaica Inn, directed by Alfred Hitchcock. It is a  period piece set in Cornwall around 1815. It was inspired by du Maurier's 1930 stay at the real Jamaica Inn, which still exists as a pub in the middle of Bodmin Moor.

The plot follows Mary Yellan, a woman who moves to stay at Jamaica Inn with her Aunt Patience and Uncle Joss after the death of her mother. She quickly finds out that the inn is an unsavoury place, mistrusted by the locals, and that her uncle is closely linked with a group of suspicious men who appear to be smugglers.

Characters
The characters presented throughout the novel include (in order of introduction): 
 Mary Yellan, main character
 Joshua "Joss" Merlyn, inn-keeper and uncle of Mary.
 Patience Merlyn, Mary's aunt and wife of Joss
 Henry "Harry", a pedlar and associate of Joss
 Jeremiah "Jem" Merlyn, Joss's younger brother
 Squire Bassat, Squire of North Hill, local Magistrate
 Rev. Francis Davey, Vicar of Altarnun
 Hannah, Vicar of Altarnun's housekeeper
 Mrs. Bassat, wife of Squire Bassat

Plot
Mary Yellan, 23 years old, was brought up on a farm in Helford. After her father's and later her mother's death and with the subsequent decay of their farm, she is forced to sell it and their surviving animals, and as a promise to her mother, Mary goes on a day at the end of November in a coach trip with her only belongings in one simple chest to live with her only surviving relative: her mother's sister, Patience Merlyn, in a coaching inn called Jamaica Inn. Patience's husband, Joss Merlyn, is a local bully, stands almost seven feet tall and is a drunk. On arriving at the gloomy and threatening inn, Mary finds her formerly pretty, merry and friendly aunt, who had once been proposed to by a prosperous and honest farmer who loved her, in a ghost-like state under the thumb of the vicious Joss, and soon realises that something unusual is afoot at the inn, which has no guests and is open to the public only to serve food and mostly drink. She tries to squeeze the truth out of her uncle during one of his binges, but he tells her, "I'm not drunk enough to tell you why I live in this God-forgotten spot, and why I'm the landlord of Jamaica Inn".

Mary and Joss's younger brother Jem leave the moors on a jingle for Christmas Eve and spend a day together in the town of Launceston, during which Jem sells a horse he stole from Squire Bassat of North Hill back to his unwitting wife. With the money earned in other sales, Jem offers Mary a pair of gold earrings and a red shawl. He confesses to her that he has many "wives" in Cornwall. Despite Jem's offer to spend the night together with her at a local inn, Mary refuses. When it comes time to return to Jamaica Inn, Jem leaves Mary to get the jingle, but never returns. Mary has no way to get home except by walking but when she attempts this realises the weather and distance make it impossible. At this point Francis Davey passes her on the road in a hired coach and offers her a lift home. During the journey, he explains to her that he has just come from a meeting where it was settled that His Majesty's Government was going to create a patrol system for the British coasts from the beginning of the new year and bring an end to the shipwrecks. He leaves the coach at the crossroads to walk to Altarnun. The coach is then waylaid by her uncle's band of wreckers and the coach driver is killed. Almost raped by Harry when trying to escape, Mary resists him but is caught, forced to go along with the wreckers and has to watch as they 'wreck' - tricking a ship into steering itself on to the rocks and then murdering the survivors of the shipwreck as they swim ashore - despite her vain attempt to warn the ship's crew.

A few days later, Jem comes to speak with Mary, who is locked in her room at the inn. With Jem's help, Mary escapes and goes to Altarnun to tell the vicar about Joss's misdeeds but he isn't at home. She leaves him a written note and then goes to the squire's home and tells his wife her story but Mrs. Bassat tells Mary that her husband already has the evidence to arrest Joss and has gone to do so. Mrs. Bassat has her driver take Mary to Jamaica Inn, where they arrive before the Squire's party. Mary goes inside and finds her uncle stabbed to death; the squire and his men arrive soon thereafter and discover Patience similarly murdered.

The vicar arrives at the inn, having received the note Mary left for him that afternoon, and offers her refuge for the night. The next day, Mary finds in his desk drawer a drawing by the vicar; she is shocked to see that he has drawn himself as a wolf while the members of his congregation have heads of sheep. The vicar returns and tells Mary that Jem was the one who informed on Joss. When he realises that she has seen the drawing, the vicar reveals that he was the true head of the wrecker gang and directly responsible for the murders of Joss and Patience. He then flees from the vicarage, taking Mary as his hostage under the threat of violence. The vicar explains that he sought enlightenment in the Christian Church but did not find it and instead found it in the practices of the ancient Druids. As they flee across the moor on horses to try to reach a ship to sail to Spain, Squire Bassat and Jem lead a search party with dogs that closes the gap, eventually coming close enough for Jem to shoot at the vicar, who throws himself down a cliff, and rescue Mary.

Mary has an offer to work as a servant for the Bassats and their two children, but instead plans to return to Helford. On the day of her return home, at the beginning of January, as she drives a cart on the moor, she comes across Jem, leading a cart with all of his possessions, headed in the opposite direction. After some discussion, Mary decides to abandon her plans to return to Helford to go with Jem out of Cornwall.

Adaptations

Film
 A film adaptation of the novel was produced in 1939, directed by Alfred Hitchcock, and starring Charles Laughton and Maureen O'Hara. The film differs from the book in some respects, with Francis Davey being replaced by Sir Humphrey Pengallan (Laughton). Du Maurier was not enamoured of the film.

Television
 Jamaica Inn (1983), an ITV miniseries starring Jane Seymour, Trevor Eve, Billie Whitelaw, Patrick McGoohan and was nearer the original story than the Hitchcock film.
 L'auberge de la Jamaïque (1995), a French TV movie starring Gilles Béhat and his daughter Alice Béat.
 Jamaica Inn (2014), a BBC miniseries starring Jessica Brown Findlay, Matthew McNulty, Sean Harris, Joanne Whalley and Ben Daniels.

Radio
 9 April 1946 with Louise Allbritton, part of the Theatre of Romance series.
BBC Radio full cast adaptations:
 1939, adapted by Peter Stucley and produced by Michael Goodwin.
 1947, in five episodes, adapted by Jonquil Antony and produced by Ayton Whitaker.
 1950, in five episodes, adapted by Jonquil Antony and produced by Norman Wright.
 1966, in five episodes, adapted by Jonquil Antony and produced by Norman Wright.
 1975, in four episodes, adapted by Brian Gear and produced by Brian Miller.
 1983, adapted by Barry Campbell and directed by Derek Hoddinott. [unconfirmed]
 1984, in four episodes, adapted by Brian Gear and directed by Brian Miller.
 1991, in four episodes, adapted by Michael Bakewell and directed by Enyd Williams.
 2003, in four episodes, adapted by Michael Bakewell.
 2015, in 10 episodes, adapted by Sue Allen and produced by Rob Carter.

BBC Radio serialised solo readings: 
 1946, in 20 episodes, read by Howard Marion-Crawford.
 1977, in 12 episodes, abridged and read by Delia Paton.
 1996, in 10 episodes, read by Jenny Agutter and produced by Jane Marshal.

Audiobooks: 
 1983, Music for Pleasure abridged recording by Trevor Eve, the same year he starred in the ITV TV adaptation. Only issued on cassette.
 1992, Chivers Audio Books unabridged recording by Tony Britton. Originally issued on cassette, then in 2007 on MP3 by Audible
 1993, Random House Audiobooks abridged recording by Josie Lawrence, only issued on cassette.
 2004, Hodder Headline Audiobooks abridged recording by Samantha Bond, issued on cassette and CD.

Stage
 The first known stage adaptation of Jamaica Inn was scripted by Trevor Hedden and performed on tour by the Orchard Theatre Company in 1985. A second adaptation, by David Horlock, was first performed at Salisbury Playhouse in 1990.
 An adaptation by John King was performed at the Regent Centre in 1993 and was to be performed again in February 2009.
 A 2004 adaptation by Lisa Evans was also performed in 2007 and 2017.

In popular culture
 The track "Jamaica Inn" on singer Tori Amos's 2005 album The Beekeeper is a song about "a man and a woman falling out"; it references the du Maurier novel and the wreckers of north Cornwall.
 In a 12 June 2012 interview with Rolling Stone, Neil Peart of the rock band Rush described how the theme of the wreckers plays throughout the band's 2012 studio release Clockwork Angels.
 The track "A Smuggler's Tale" from the album Albion of the British Melodic Hard Rock band Ten is based on the novel.

See also

 Kilmar Tor
 Brown Willy
 Rough Tor
 The Lighthouse at the End of the World

Notes

References

External links
 Review and plot summary at DaphneduMaurier.org

1936 British novels
Fiction set in 1815
British novels adapted into films
Doubleday, Doran books
English Gothic novels
British novels adapted into television shows
Novels by Daphne du Maurier
Novels set in Cornwall
Novels set in the 1810s
Novels about pirates
Victor Gollancz Ltd books